Pirah or pira is a type of Philippine bolo sword or knife characterized by a heavy blade and a wide tip. It superficially resembles a falchion but is much heavier. It is the traditional weapon favored by the Yakan people of Basilan Island. It usually features a kakatua ("cockatoo") hilt, which among the Yakan is distinctively elongated to function as arm support. Among Cebuano people and other Visayans, a similar sword is also known as the pira, but differs in that it has an acutely pointed tip. Like other bolos, pirah were commonly used as farm implements, in addition to being used in combat.

Gallery

See also 
Filipino martial arts
Bolo
Kampilan
Kalis
Klewang
Panabas

References

Blade weapons
Filipino swords